Captain Edgar Kinghorn Myles,  (29 July 1894 – 31 January 1977) was a British Army officer and an English recipient of the Victoria Cross (VC), the highest award for gallantry in the face of the enemy that can be awarded to British and Commonwealth forces.

Military career
Myles was deployed with the 8th (Service) Battalion, Welsh Regiment, British Army, attached to 9th (Service) Battalion, Worcestershire Regiment. On 9 April 1916 at Sanna-i-Yat, Mesopotamia, during combat, Second lieutenant Myles went out alone several times in front of British advanced trenches to assist wounded men on the battlefield. While under heavy rifle fire, and at great personal risk, he carried in a wounded officer to safety. For his service he received the Victoria Cross. The citation for his award read: 

Myles transferred to the King's Regiment (Liverpool) as a lieutenant in 1923 and was later promoted to captain.

Myles' Victoria Cross is displayed at Worcester City Art Gallery & Museum in Worcester, England.

References

External links
Location of grave and VC medal Devonshire)
Worcestershire Regiment website

1894 births
1977 deaths
Burials in Devon
People from Wanstead
British Army personnel of World War I
Welch Regiment officers
Worcestershire Regiment officers
Military personnel from Essex
King's Regiment (Liverpool) officers
Companions of the Distinguished Service Order
British World War I recipients of the Victoria Cross
British Army recipients of the Victoria Cross
British Army personnel of World War II